Tursun Uljabayevich Uljabayev (1 May 1916, Ghafurov, Ghafurov District, Sughd province, Tajikistan – 31 May 1988, Dushanbe, Tajikistan) was First Secretary of the Communist Party of Tajikistan between May 24, 1956 and April 12, 1961.

Later life and death
In 1961 he was accused of falsifying official documents related to cotton production and expelled from the Communist Party. He went on to work as a farm director and retired in 1986. He died in Dushanbe on 31 May 1988.

References

1916 births
1988 deaths
Heads of government of the Tajik Soviet Socialist Republic
First Secretaries of the Communist Party of Tajikistan
Recipients of the Order of Lenin
Second convocation members of the Supreme Soviet of the Soviet Union
Third convocation members of the Supreme Soviet of the Soviet Union
Fourth convocation members of the Supreme Soviet of the Soviet Union
Fifth convocation members of the Supreme Soviet of the Soviet Union
People from Sughd Region